The following is a list of characters in the American serial drama television series 24, 24: Live Another Day, and 24: Legacy by season and event. The list first names the actor, followed by the character. Some characters have their own pages; see the box below.

The show consists of an ensemble cast. A total of 60 actors have been credited as a part of the starring cast, over the course of eight seasons, one television film, one miniseries, and one spin-off series, international remakes notwithstanding. These are Kiefer Sutherland, Leslie Hope, Sarah Clarke, Elisha Cuthbert, Dennis Haysbert, Sarah Wynter, Xander Berkeley, Penny Johnson Jerald, Carlos Bernard, Reiko Aylesworth, James Badge Dale, Kim Raver, Alberta Watson, William Devane, Lana Parrilla, Roger Cross, Mary Lynn Rajskub, Gregory Itzin, James Morrison, Louis Lombardi, Jean Smart, D. B. Woodside, Peter MacNicol, Jayne Atkinson, Carlo Rota, Eric Balfour, Marisol Nichols, Regina King, Cherry Jones, Annie Wersching, Colm Feore, Bob Gunton, Jeffrey Nordling, Rhys Coiro, Janeane Garofalo, Anil Kapoor, Mykelti Williamson, Katee Sackhoff, Chris Diamantopoulos, John Boyd, Freddie Prinze Jr., Yvonne Strahovski, Tate Donovan, Gbenga Akinnagbe, Giles Matthey, Michael Wincott, Benjamin Bratt, Corey Hawkins, Miranda Otto, Anna Diop, Teddy Sears, Ashley Thomas, Dan Bucatinsky, Coral Peña, Charlie Hofheimer, Sheila Vand, Raphael Acloque, Gerald McRaney, and Jimmy Smits.

Overview

Main cast
  = Main cast (credited) 
  = Recurring cast (4+)
  = Guest cast (1-3)

Recurring and guest cast
The following recurring guest stars appeared in at least five episodes or were distinguished in the guest star credits.

 Key:  = Recurring
 Key:  = Special Guest

24: Season 1

The Bauers
 Kiefer Sutherland – Jack Bauer
 Leslie Hope – Teri Bauer
 Elisha Cuthbert – Kim Bauer

CTU / Division
 Sarah Clarke – Nina Myers
 Carlos Bernard – Tony Almeida
 Karina Arroyave – Jamey Farrell
 Eric Balfour – Milo Pressman
 Michael O'Neill – Richard Walsh
 Scott Denny – Scott Baylor
 Xander Berkeley – George Mason
 Tamara Tunie – Alberta Green
 Paul Schulze – Ryan Chappelle
 Kevin Ramsey – Ted Paulson
 Kirk Baltz – Teddy Hanlin
 Sam Ayers – Jeff Breeher

Palmer's family and staff
 Dennis Haysbert – David Palmer
 Penny Johnson Jerald – Sherry Palmer
 Megalyn Echikunwoke – Nicole Palmer
 Vicellous Reon Shannon – Keith Palmer
 Jude Ciccolella – Mike Novick
 Tanya Wright – Patty Brooks
 Kara Zediker – Elizabeth Nash
 Zach Grenier – Carl Webb
 Glenn Morshower – Aaron Pierce
 Greg Hartigan – Secret Service Agent Berkin
 Jesse D. Goins – Secret Service Agent Alan Hayes
 Michael Bryan French – Secret Service Agent Frank Simes

Other associates of Palmer
 Devika Parikh – Maureen Kingsley
 John Prosky – George Ferragamo
 Ivar Brogger – Frank Ames

First assassination plot
 Michael Massee — Ira Gaines
 Daniel Bess — Rick Allen
 Matthew Carey — Dan Mounts
 Richard Burgi — Kevin Carroll
 Rudolf Martin — Jonathan Matijevich
 Mia Kirshner — Mandy
 Silas Weir Mitchell – Eli Stram
 John Hawkes — Greg Penticoff
 Kim Murphy — Bridgit
 Al Leong — Neill Choi
 Jesse Corti — Charles McLemore

Drazen's family and associates
 Dennis Hopper — Victor Drazen
 Željko Ivanek — Andre Drazen
 Misha Collins — Alexis Drazen
 Henri Lubatti — Jovan Myovic
 Currie Graham — Ted Cofell

Rick's friends outside the plot
 Edoardo Ballerini — Frank Allard
 Navi Rawat — Melanie

Miscellaneous
 Wade Andrew Williams — Robert Ellis
 Jacqui Maxwell — Janet York
 Lou Diamond Phillips — Mark DeSalvo
 Kathleen Wilhoite — Lauren Proctor
 Pauley Perrette — Tanya
 Jason Matthew Smith — Chris
 Rudolf Martin — Martin Belkin
 Keram Malicki-Sánchez — Larry Rogow
 John Cothran, Jr. — Srgt. Kiley
 David Barrera — Officer Phillips
 Tony Perez — Srgt. Douglas Newman
 Kim Miyori — Dr. Susan Y. Collier
 Judith Scott — Dr. Rose M. Kent

24: Season 2

CTU / Division
 Kiefer Sutherland — Jack Bauer
 Xander Berkeley — George Mason
 Carlos Bernard — Tony Almeida
 Reiko Aylesworth — Michelle Dessler
 Paul Schulze — Ryan Chappelle
 Randle Mell — Brad Hammond (CTU Division Supervisor)
 Sara Gilbert — Paula Schaeffer
 Lourdes Benedicto — Carrie Turner
 Donnie Keshawarz — Yusuf Auda
 Daniel Dae Kim — Tom Baker
 John Eddins — Agent Richards
 Donzaleigh Abernathy — Barbara Maccabee
 Michael Cudlitz — Rick Phillips

Palmer's family and administration
 Dennis Haysbert — President David Palmer
 Penny Johnson Jerald — Sherry Palmer
 Vicellous Reon Shannon — Keith Palmer
 Jude Ciccolella — Mike Novick
 Glenn Morshower — Aaron Pierce
 Timothy Carhart — Eric Rayburn
 Harris Yulin — Roger Stanton
 Michelle Forbes — Lynne Kresge
 Alan Dale — Vice President James Prescott
 Steven Culp — Ted Simmons
 John Rubinstein — Alex (Secretary of State)
 Robert Pine — Secretary of Agriculture
 Dean Norris — General Bowden
 Terry Bozeman — Richard Armus
 Tamlyn Tomita — Jenny Dodge (Press Secretary)
 Richard Holden — General Stone
 Greg Hartigan — Secret Service Agent Berkin

Kim's Story
 Elisha Cuthbert — Kim Bauer
 Billy Burke — Gary Matheson
 Tracy Middendorf — Carla Matheson
 Skye McCole Bartusiak — Megan Matheson
 Kevin Dillon — Lonnie McRae
 Innis Casey — Miguel
 Michael McGrady — Officer Raymond Brown
 Miguel Perez — Ranger Mike Kramer
 Victor Rivers — Officer Amis
 Jamison Jones — Deputy Nirman
 Sterling Macer, Jr. — Deputy Raynes
 Susan Gibney — Anna
 Lombardo Boyar — Ramon Garcia
 Brent Sexton — Frank Davies

Foreign diplomats
 Alexander Zale — Ambassador Shareef
 Christopher Maher — Deputy Prime Minister Barghouti
 Nicholas Guilak — Farhad Salim

The Warners and the Naiyeers
 John Terry — Bob Warner
 Sarah Wynter — Kate Warner
 Laura Harris — Marie Warner
 Phillip Rhys — Reza Naiyeer
 Yareli Arizmendi — Karima Naiyeer
 Shaun Duke — Hasan Naiyeer

Traitors involved in terrorist plot
 Sarah Clarke — Nina Myers
 Gregg Henry — Jonathan Wallace

Wald's crew
 Jon Gries — Joseph Wald
 Douglas O'Keeffe — Eddie Grant
 Gregory Sporleder — Dave
 Jimmi Simpson — Chris

Ali's family and Second Wave
 Francesco Quinn — Syed Ali
 Anthony Azizi — Mamud Rasheed Faheen
 Shaheen Vaaz — Syed Ali's wife
 Ike Bram — Fareed Ali
 Raja Jean Fenske — Asad Ali
 Aki Avni — Mohsen
 Maz Jobrani — Marko Khatami
 Marc Casabani — Omar
 Fred Toma — Basheer

Peter Kingsley Group
 Tobin Bell — Peter Kingsley
 Thomas Kretschmann — Max
 Eugene Robert Glazer — Alexander Trepkos
 Mia Kirshner — Mandy
 Nina Landey — Eve
 Rick D. Wasserman — Alex Hewitt
 Peter Outerbridge — Ronnie Stark
 Brian Goodman — Raymond O'Hara
 Jeff Wincott — Davis
 Mark Ivanir — Trask

Miscellaneous federal agents, police, and medical personnel
 Scott Allan Campbell — Dr. Porter (Field medic at warehouse, diagnoses George Mason)
 Sal Landi — Sgt. Arroyo (LAPD officer at warehouse)
 Christopher Murray — FBI Agent Dockerty (Agent at airfield)

Miscellaneous characters
 Antonio David Lyons — Cam Strocker (Telephone Repairman taken hostage)
 Peter Gregory — Dr. Spire (Doctor at medical center)
 Bernard White — Al-Fulani (Imam)
 Justin Louis — Danny Dessler (Michelle Dessler's brother)
 Jeff Wincott – Davis (kidnaps and tortures Jack)
 Eric Christian Olsen — John Mason (George Mason's son)
 Jim Abele — Ralph Burton (Private Investigator who helps Kate Warner)
 Al Sapienza — Paul Koplin (Ralph Burton's boss)
 Michael Holden — Ron Wieland (Journalist; Held by the President)
 Michael Mantell — Steve Hillenburg (CIA Operative who aides Sherry Palmer)
 Michael James Reed — Foreman (Foreman for a construction crew that Marie Warner talks to)
 Nick Offerman — Marcus (Captures Kate Warner and assaulted Yusuf Auda)
 Raymond Cruz — Rouse (Captures Kate Warner and assaulted Yusuf Auda)
 Maurice Compte — Cole (Captures Kate Warner and assaulted Yusuf Auda)
 Carmen Argenziano — General Gratz

24: Season 3

CTU / Division
 Kiefer Sutherland — Jack Bauer
 Elisha Cuthbert — Kim Bauer
 Carlos Bernard — Tony Almeida
 Reiko Aylesworth — Michelle Dessler
 James Badge Dale — Chase Edmunds
 Jesse Borrego — Gael Ortega
 Mary Lynn Rajskub — Chloe O'Brian
 Zachary Quinto — Adam Kaufman
 Paul Schulze — Ryan Chappelle
 Randle Mell — Brad Hammond
 Daniel Dae Kim — Tom Baker
 Butch Klein — Darren Richards
 Jenette Goldstein — Rae Plachecki
 Carrie Kim — Jade Paik
 David Herman — Dalton Furrelle
 Ed Wasser — Jason Carasone
 Tony Wayne — Robin Powers
 Neal Matarazzo — D.J. Graves

Palmer's family and administration and associates
 Dennis Haysbert — David Palmer (President of the United States)
 Penny Johnson Jerald — Sherry Palmer(David's ex-wife)
 Glenn Morshower — Aaron Pierce (The head of Palmer's Secret Service detail)
 D. B. Woodside — Wayne Palmer(David Palmer's Brother; Chief of Staff)
 Wendy Crewson — Anne Packard (Palmer's personal doctor; Palmer's girlfriend)
 Jamie McShane — Gerry Whitehorn (Palmer's press chief)
 Albert Hall — Alan Milliken (Major contributor to Palmer's campaign/Ally of his Presidency)
 Gina Torres — Julia Milliken (Wife of Alan Milliken)
 Alan Dale — Jim Prescott (Vice President of the United States)
 Conor O'Farrell — Ted Packard (Anne's ex-husband)
 Michael Cavanaugh — Joseph O'Laughlin (Secretary of Homeland Security)
 Greg Hartigan — Secret Service Agent Berkin
 Richard Holden — General Stone

Saunders' family and crew
 Paul Blackthorne — Stephen Saunders (Former soldier and MI6 agent; turned into terrorist; main villain)
 Greg Ellis — Michael Amador (Seller of biological weapon)
 Lothaire Bluteau — Marcus Alvers (arms dealer; sold the Cordilla Virus; assumed to have a past with Nina Myers)
 Salvator Xuereb — Arthur Rabens (one of Stephen Saunders' couriers, has biological weapon in L.A.)
 Alexandra Lydon — Jane Saunders (Daughter of Stephen Saunders)
 Joe D'Angerio — Osterlind (Saunders' assistant)
 Gabrielle Fitzpatrick — Diana White (lover of Steven Saunders; help fund Saunders' operation)

Salazar family and associates
 Joaquim de Almeida — Ramon Salazar (Narco-terrorist; Head of the Salazar family)
 Vincent Laresca — Hector Salazar (Ramon's brother; Head of family in Ramon's absence)
 Vanessa Ferlito — Claudia Hernandez (Girlfriend of Hector)
 Josh Cruz — Oriol (Claudia's father)
 Julian Rodriguez — Sergio (Claudia's brother)
 Lorry Goldman — Douglas Shaye (Ramon's lawyer)
 Gino Montesinos — Eduardo (Henchman)
 Eduardo Garcia — Emilio (Henchman)
 Gonzalo Menendez — Pablo (Henchman)
 David Labiosa — David Gomez (Henchman)

Singer family and associates
 Riley Smith — Kyle Singer (First time "drug dealer")
 Ted Marcoux — Sam Singer (Kyle's unemployed father)
 Lucinda Jenney — Helen Singer (Kyle's mother)
 Agnes Bruckner — Linda (Kyle's girlfriend)
 Kett Turton — Tim (Kyle's best friend)
 Darin Cooper — Don (the Singer family's landlord)

National Health Services
 Andrea Thompson — Dr. Nicole Duncan
 Christina Chang — Dr. Sunny Macer

Miscellaneous police / Federal employees / Medical
 Paul Vincent O’Connor — Police Chief Hendrix
 Tony Todd — Detective Michael Norris (interrogates Julia Milliken)
 Simon Templeman — Trevor Tomlinson (Agent in MI6 office in LA; killed in gunship attack)
 Maria del Mar — Rachel Forrester
 Kevin Chapman — Kevin Mitchell

Chandler Plaza Hotel staff and guests
 Doug Savant — Craig Phillips (Head of Hotel security)
 Paris Tanaka — Maya
 Sue Jin Song — Annalie Kim
 Scott Klace — Danny
 Brigid Brannagh — Kathy McCartney

Miscellaneous characters
 Sarah Wynter — Kate Warner (Ex-girlfriend of Jack Bauer)
 Sarah Clarke — Nina Myers (Terrorist; Former CTU agent)
 Geoff Pierson — John Keeler (Republican Presidential Candidate)
 Mark Rolston — Bruce Foxton (professional evidence retriever)
 Carlos Gómez — Luis Annicon (Prison Supervisor; one of Jack's companions in the one year operation that brought down Ramon Salazar)
 Kamala Lopez-Dawson — Theresa Ortega (Gael's wife)
 JF Pryor — Zack Porter (Drug-dealer)
 Jack Kehler — Kevin Kelly
 Matt Salinger — Mark Kanar
 Rick Garcia — Rick Garcia
 Patrick Fabian — William Cole
 Jenni Blong — Susan Cole

24: Season 4

Department of Defense / Heller's family
 Kiefer Sutherland — Jack Bauer (Special Assistant to the Secretary of Defense)
 William Devane — James Heller(United States Secretary of Defense)
 Logan Marshall-Green — Richard Heller (James Heller's son)
 Kim Raver — Audrey Raines(James Heller's daughter; Jack Bauer's girlfriend; Senior Policy Assistant to Heller)
 James Frain — Paul Raines (Audrey's estranged husband)
 David Newsom — Scott Borman (Heller's aide)

CTU / Division
 Carlos Bernard — Tony Almeida
 Reiko Aylesworth — Michelle Dessler
 Alberta Watson — Erin Driscoll
 Mary Lynn Rajskub — Chloe O'Brian
 James Morrison — Bill Buchanan
 Roger Cross — Curtis Manning
 Lana Parrilla — Sarah Gavin
 Louis Lombardi — Edgar Stiles
 Aisha Tyler — Marianne Taylor
 Robert Cicchini — Howard Bern
 Cameron Bancroft — Lee Castle
 Shawn Doyle — Ronnie Lobell
 Thomas Vincent Kelly — Marc Besson
 Butch Klein — Eric Richards
 Naomi Kirkpatrick — Meredith Atterson
 Brandon Barash — Brandon
 Shannon Becker — Allison Nichols
 Michael Bofshever — Dr. Mark Kaylis
 Gwendoline Yeo — Melissa Raab
 Alicia Coppola — Azara Nasir

Terrorist group
 Arnold Vosloo — Habib Marwan
 Nestor Serrano — Navi Araz
 Shohreh Aghdashloo — Dina Araz
 Jonathan Ahdout — Behrooz Araz
 Ned Vaughn — Mitch Anderson
 Tony Plana — Omar
 Mia Kirshner — Mandy
 Anil Kumar — Kalil Hasan
 Adam Alexi-Malle — Joseph Fayed
 Dagmara Dominczyk — Nicole
 John Thaddeus — Joseph "Joe" Prado
 Keith Szarabajka — Robert Morrison
 Kris Iyer — Sabir Ardakani
 Faran Tahir — Tomas Sherek
 Matt Gallini — Abdul Mahnesh
 Kiran Rao — Hikmat Palpatine

Keeler's family and administration
 Geoff Pierson — President John Keeler
 Chris Olivero — Kevin Keeler
 Gregory Itzin — Vice-President Charles Logan
 Jude Ciccolella — Mike Novick
 John Allen Nelson — Logan's Chief of Security Walt Cummings
 Glenn Morshower — Secret Service Agent Aaron Pierce
 Dennis Haysbert — former President David Palmer
 J. Patrick McCormack — Robert Franklin
 Patrick Kilpatrick — Secret Service Agent Dale Spalding
 Matt Salinger — Mark Kanar

McLennan-Forster storyline
 Robertson Dean — Henry Powell
 Bill Smitrovich — Gene McLennan
 Richard Marcus — Forbes
 Albie Selznick — John Reiss
 Tomas Arana — Dave Conlon
 Amin Nazemzadeh — Naji
 Omid Abtahi — Safa
 Christopher B. Duncan — Specter

Chinese Consulate
 Tzi Ma — Cheng Zhi
 Peter Chin — Lee Jong
 François Chau — Koo Yin
 Ping Wu — Su Ming

Miscellaneous characters
 Lukas Haas — Andrew Paige
 Leighton Meester — Debbie Pendleton
 Angela Goethals — Maya Driscoll (Erin Driscoll's daughter)
 Roxanne Day — Jen Slater
 T. J. Thyne — Jason Girard
 Claudette Mink — Kelly Girard
 Evan Handler — David Weiss
 Tim Kelleher — Greg Merfield (Secret Service Agent)
 Lina Patel — Nabilla Al-Jamil
 Phyllis Lyons — Karen Pendleton
 Michael Benyaer — Naseem
 Hector Luis Bustamante — Dr. Martinez
 Rick Garcia — Rick Garcia

24: Season 5

Bauer's family and associates
 Kiefer Sutherland — Jack Bauer
 Elisha Cuthbert — Kim Bauer
 Kim Raver — Audrey Raines
 C. Thomas Howell — Barry Landes

Jack's Inner Circle
 Mary Lynn Rajskub — Chloe O'Brian (CTU agent) see also CTU / Division / Homeland Security
 Reiko Aylesworth — Michelle Dessler (former CTU Division Deputy Director; Tony's wife)
 Carlos Bernard — Tony Almeida (former CTU Director; Michelle's husband)

CTU / Division / Homeland Security
 James Morrison — Bill Buchanan(CTU Director/ CTU Division Director)
 Mary Lynn Rajskub — Chloe O'Brian (CTU agent)
 Carlo Rota — Morris O'Brian (Chloe O'Brian's ex-husband)
 Sean Astin — Lynn McGill (Division; takes over as CTU Director)
 Kim Raver — Audrey Raines (DOD liaison for CTU)
 Louis Lombardi — Edgar Stiles(CTU agent)
 Roger Cross — Curtis Manning (CTU agent; Head of Field Ops)
 Jayne Atkinson — Karen Hayes(Homeland Security official)
 Stephen Spinella — Miles Papazian (Hayes' assistant)
 Jonah Lotan — Spenser Wolff (CTU agent)
 Danielle Burgio — Carrie Bendis (CTU agent)
 Kate Mara — Shari Rothenberg (CTU agent)
 Martin A. Papazian — Rick Burke
 Thomas Vincent Kelly — Marc Besson
 Jenny Levine — Valerie Harris
 Peter Asle Holden — Harry Swinton (CTU security guard)
 Carl Edwards — Jim Hill (Homeland Security official)
 Josie Di Vincenzo — CTU Agent Mara Tyler
 David Joyner — CTU S.W.A.T Agent Jones
 Michael Roddy — CTU S.W.A.T Agent Smith
 Tony Wayne — Robin Powers
 Alex Castillo — CTU Guard Hugo
 Marci Michelle — CTU Agent Marcy Reynolds
 Thomas Howell — CTU Guard Henry
 Billy Chamberlain — CTU Agent Fitzpatrick
 John McCain — CTU staffer

Sentox Nerve Gas Conspiracy
 Gregory Itzin — Charles Logan
 Paul McCrane — Graem Bauer
 Peter Weller — Christopher Henderson
 Geraint Wyn Davies — James Nathanson
 John Allen Nelson — Walt Cummings
 Jeff Kober — Conrad Haas
 Robert Rusler — Hank
 José Zúñiga — Joseph Malina
 Sky Soleil — John Stratton
 John Butox — Steve Miller
 Carl Gilliard — Ron Swanson

Federal Government officials, employees and associates
 Gregory Itzin — Charles Logan (President)
 Jean Smart — Martha Logan (First Lady)
 Ray Wise — Hal Gardner (Vice President)
 John Allen Nelson — Walt Cummings (Chief of Staff)
 Jude Ciccolella — Mike Novick (Senior advisor)
 Glenn Morshower — Aaron Pierce (Secret Service)
 William Devane — James Heller (Secretary of Defense)
 Sandrine Holt — Evelyn Martin (Martha's personal aide)
 Alla Korot — Suzanne Cummings (Walt's wife)
 Anita Finlay — Wendy Brown (White House aide)
 Robb Reesman — Dr. Hill (Martha's personal doctor)
 Taylor Nichols — Burke
 David McDivitt — White House staffer
 Tracy Howe — Secret Service Agent Justin Adams
 Jason Grutter — Secret Service Agent Doug Masters
 Tim Mikulecky — Secret Service Agent Mark Wexler

Palmer family
 Dennis Haysbert — David Palmer
 D. B. Woodside — Wayne Palmer

Russian Federation
 Nick Jameson — Yuri Suvarov
 Kathleen Gati — Anya Suvarov

Russian separatists and collaborators
 Julian Sands — Vladimir Bierko
 Mark Sheppard — Ivan Erwich
 David Dayan Fisher — Anton Beresch
 Alex Kuznetsov — Ostroff
 Stana Katic — Collette Stenger
 Patrick Bauchau — Jacob Rossler
 Timothy Omundson — Polokoff
 Marat Oyvetsky — Viktor Grigorin
 Taras Los — Chevensky
 Robert Maffia — Andrei
 Timothy V. Murphy — Schaeffer
 Yorgo Constantine — Mikhail

People's Republic of China
 Tzi Ma — Cheng Zhi

Miscellaneous Feds/Police/Medical
 John G. Connolly — Sgt. Mike McLaren

Miscellaneous characters
 Connie Britton — Diane Huxley
 Brady Corbet — Derek Huxley
 Penny Balfour — Jenny McGill
 Henry Ian Cusick — Theo Stoller
 Matthew Boylan — Dwayne Thompkins
 Angela Sarafyan — Inessa Kovalevsky
 Skylar Roberge — Amy Martin
 JoBeth Williams — Miriam Henderson
 Pia Artesona — Joanna Tandy
 Channon Roe — Cal
 Andrew Hawkes — Scott Evans
 Tom Wright — Admiral Kirkland
 Jeremy Ray Valdez — Petty Officer Tim Rooney
 Eddie Mekka — Ned
 Rick Garcia — Rick Garcia

24: Season 6

Bauer's family and associates
 Kiefer Sutherland — Jack Bauer
 James Cromwell — Phillip Bauer
 Paul McCrane — Graem Bauer
 Rena Sofer — Marilyn Bauer
 Evan Ellingson — Josh Bauer
 Kim Raver — Audrey Raines
 Mark Bramhall — Sam

CTU / Division / District
 James Morrison — Bill Buchanan
 Marisol Nichols — Nadia Yassir
 Mary Lynn Rajskub — Chloe O'Brian
 Carlo Rota — Morris O'Brian
 Roger Cross — Curtis Manning
 Eric Balfour — Milo Pressman
 Rick Schroder — Mike Doyle
 Martin A. Papazian — Rick Burke
 Spencer Garrett — Ben Kram (supervisor from Division)
 James C. Victor — Hal Turner (CTU Agent)
 Robb Weller — CTU Field Agent
 Brian Silverman — CTU Field Agent
 Lauten Richard Metcalfe — CTU Agent Stan Shavers
 Lex Cassar — CTU Agent Ryan
 Merik Tadros — CTU Agent Jamal
 J. R. Bourne — CTU Agent Connell Johnson
 Tony Wayne — Robin Powers

Federal Government officials, employees and associates
 D. B. Woodside — Wayne Palmer (President of the United States)
 Peter MacNicol — Tom Lennox(President Palmer's Chief of Staff)
 Jayne Atkinson — Karen Hayes (National Security Advisor)
 Regina King — Sandra Palmer
 Powers Boothe — Noah Daniels (Vice-President of the United States)
 Chad Lowe — Reed Pollock (Deputy Chief of Staff)
 Kari Matchett — Lisa Miller
 Bob Gunton — Ethan Kanin (Secretary of Defense)
 Michael Shanks — Mark Bishop (Lobbyist)
 Michael Reilly Burke — Bruce Carson
 Jim Holmes — Arthur Welton
 Ray Laska — Kevin Graves (Attorney General)
 D. C. Douglas — Blake Simon (President Palmer's Advisor)
 Matt McKenzie — Agent Hollister (Secret Service Agent)
 Andrea Grano — Ellen Price (President Palmer's press secretary)
 Jolene Kim — Melinda (President Palmer's assistant)  
 Jamison Jones — Dan (Head of Secret Service)
 William Bumiller — Agent Lowry (Secret Service Agent) 
 Matt Battaglia — Agent Jennings (Secret Service Agent)
 Ajay Mehta — Middle Eastern Ambassador
 Peter Iannone — Homeland Security Official
 Kurt Hueig — Homeland Security Official
 Myra Mawk — Homeland Security Official

People's Republic of China
 Tzi Ma — Cheng Zhi
 Ian Anthony Dale — Zhou Yong

Russian/Islamic Terrorists
 Adoni Maropis — Abu Fayed
 Rade Šerbedžija — General Dmitri Gredenko
 David Hunt — Darren McCarthy
 Kal Penn — Ahmed Amar
 Shaun Majumder — Hasan Numair
 Missy Cryder — Rita Brady
 Sam Kanater — General Mohmar Habib  
 Steven Schub — Samir Hussain
 Dylan Kenin — Victor    
 Patrick Sabongui — Nasir
 Said Faraj — Halil
 Sammy Sheik — Masheer
 Adrian R'Mante — Omar

Phillip's Conspirators/BXJ Technologies
 James Cromwell — Phillip Bauer
 Paul McCrane — Graem Bauer
 Maury Sterling — Kozelek Hacker
 Adrian Neil — Liddy

Anacostia Detention Facility
 Scott William Winters — Agent Samuels
 Al Faris — Salim
 Haaz Sleiman — Heydar

Russian Federation
 John Noble — Anatoly Markov
 Nick Jameson — Yuri Suvarov
 Kathleen Gati — Anya Suvarov

Miscellaneous characters
 William Devane — James Heller
 Glenn Morshower — Aaron Pierce
 Gregory Itzin — Charles Logan
 Jean Smart — Martha Logan
 Alexander Siddig — Hamri Al-Assad
 Harry Lennix — Walid Al-Rezani
 Raphael Sbarge — Ray Wallace
 Megan Gallagher — Jillian Wallace
 Michael Angarano — Scott Wallace
 Chris Kramer — Stuart Pressman
 Pat Healy — Marcus
 Eric Bruskotter — Stan
 Nancy Cartwright — Jeannie Tyler
 Devon Gummersall — Mark Hauser
 Scott Michael Campbell — Brady Hauser

24: Redemption and Season 7
The following characters appeared in the television film 24: Redemption and the seventh season of the series.

Bauer family and others
 Kiefer SutherlandJack Bauer
 Elisha CuthbertKim Bauer
 Paul WesleyStephen (Kim's husband)
 Claire GeareTeri (Kim's daughter)

FBI
 Jeffrey NordlingLarry Moss (FBI Special Agent in Charge)
 Annie WerschingRenee Walker (FBI Special Agent)
 Janeane GarofaloJanis Gold (FBI Analyst)
 Rhys CoiroSean Hillinger (FBI Analyst)
 Ever CarradineErika (Computer Analyst)
 John BillingsleyMichael Latham (Security specialist)

Federal government officials, employees and associates
 Powers BoothePresident Noah Daniels
 Cherry JonesAllison Taylor (President of the United States of America)
 Colm FeoreHenry Taylor (First Gentleman)
 Sprague GraydenOlivia Taylor (First Daughter)
 Eric LivelyRoger Taylor
 Cameron DaddoMitchell Hayworth (Vice President of the United States of America)
 Peter MacNicol as Tom Lennox
 Bob GuntonEthan Kanin (White House Chief of Staff)
 Isaach De BankoléPrime Minister Ule Motobo
 Glenn MorshowerAaron Pierce(Former Secret Service Agent)
 Warren KoleBrian Gedge (Secret Service Agent)
 Mark KielyEdward Vossler (Secret Service Agent)
 Frank John HughesTim Woods (Secretary of Homeland Security)
 Kurtwood SmithSenator Blaine Mayer
 Gil BellowsFrank Trammell (U.S. Embassy Official in Sengala)
 Ryan CutronaAdmiral John Smith
 Christina ChangDr. Sunny Macer
 Mark DerwinJoe Stevens (Secretary of State)
 Lesley FeraAngela Nelson (Press Secretary)
 Sean MichaelCharles Solenz

"Underground" CTU
 Kiefer SutherlandJack Bauer
 Carlos BernardTony Almeida
 Mary Lynn RajskubChloe O'Brian
 James MorrisonBill Buchanan
 Carlo RotaMorris O'Brian

Juma regime
 Tony ToddGeneral Benjamin Juma (Leader of Coup in Sangala)
 Hakeem Kae-KazimColonel Iké Dubaku
 Peter WingfieldDavid Emerson
 Arjay SmithLaurent Dubaku
 Mark AikenNichols
 Dameon ClarkeAlan Tanner
 Maximiliano HernándezDonnie Fox
 Nick ChinlundMasters

Starkwood
 Jon VoightJonas Hodges
 Rory CochraneGreg Seaton
 Chris MulkeyDoug Knowles
 Michael RodrickStokes
 Gabriel CasseusRobert Galvez
 Sebastian RochéJohn Quinn
 Eyal PodellRyan Burnett (Senator Mayer's Advisor who is in league with Starkwood)

Prion Variant cabal
 Will PattonAlan Wilson
 Amy Price-FrancisCara Bowden (operative disguised as Hodges' lawyer)

Miscellaneous characters
 Robert CarlyleCarl Benton
 Tommy FlanaganGabriel Schector
 Kris LemcheChris Whitley
 Carly PopeSamantha Roth (Roger Taylor's Girlfriend)
 Tonya PinkinsAlama Motobo
 Andi ChapmanRosa Donoso
 Enuka OkumaMarika Donoso
 Omid AbtahiJibraan Al-Zarian
 Ravi KapoorMuhtadi Gohar
 Rafi GavronHamid Al-Zarian
 Siyabulela RambaWillie
 Don McManusBob Peluso
 Mary Page KellerSarah

24: Season 8

Bauer's family and associates
 Kiefer Sutherland — Jack Bauer
 Elisha Cuthbert — Kim Bauer
 Annie Wersching — Renee Walker
 Paul Wesley — Stephen
 Claire Geare — Teri

CTU NY
 Mykelti Williamson — Brian Hastings
 Mary Lynn Rajskub — Chloe O'Brian
 Freddie Prinze Jr. — Cole Ortiz
 Katee Sackhoff — Dana Walsh
 John Boyd — Arlo Glass
 Julian Morris — Owen
 Matthew Yang King (as Matt Yang King) — King
 Jamie Martz — Nate Burke
 Justin Alston — Beck

Federal Government officials, employees and associates
 Cherry Jones — President Allison Taylor
 Chris Diamantopoulos — Chief of Staff Rob Weiss
 Bob Gunton — Secretary of State Ethan Kanin
 Gregory Itzin — Former President Charles Logan
 Frank John Hughes — Tim Woods
 Reed Diamond — Jason Pillar
 Michael Gaston — General David Brucker
 Eriq La Salle — UN Secretary General
 Lesley Fera  — Angela Nelson
 Merle Dandridge — Kristen Smith
 Julie Claire — Eden Linley
 Michael Irby — Adrion Bishop
 Christina Cox — Molly O'Connor
 Kathryn Winslow — Ellen Kramer
 Chris McGarry — Frank Haynum
 Sarah Hollis  — Susan

Islamic Republic of Kamistan
 Anil Kapoor — President Omar Hassan
 Necar Zadegan — Dalia Hassan
 Nazneen Contractor — Kayla Hassan
 Akbar Kurtha — Farhad Hassan
 T. J. Ramini — Tarin Faroush
 Mido Hamada — Samir Mehran
 Rami Malek — Marcos Al-Zacar
 Hrach Titizian — Nabeel
 Navid Negahban — Jamot
 Ethan Rains — Ali
 Rizwan Manji — Ahman

Red Square
 Jürgen Prochnow — Sergei Bazhaev
 David Anders — Josef Bazhaev
 Gene Farber — Oleg Bazhaev
 Callum Keith Rennie — Vladimir Laitanan
 Doug Hutchison — Davros
 Jordan Marder — Dimitri
 Jon Sklaroff — Ziya Dakhilov
 Tony Curran — Lugo Elson

Russian Federation
 Nick Jameson — President Yuri Suvarov
 Graham McTavish — Mikhail Novakovich
 Joel Bissonnette — Pavel Tokarev

Miscellaneous characters
 Benito Martinez — Victor Aruz
 Clayne Crawford — Kevin Wade
 Jennifer Westfeldt — Meredith Reed
 Michael Filipowich — Nick Coughlin
 Mare Winningham — Elaine Al-Zacar
 Stephen Root — Bill Prady
 D. B. Sweeney — Mark Bledsoe
 Michael Madsen — Jim Ricker
 Joe Nieves — NYPD Officer James "Jim" Koernig
 Sandra Purpuro — Maggie Koernig
 Domenick Lombardozzi — NYPD Officer John Mazoni
 Johnny Wu — NYPD Officer Philip Lu
 Eli Goodman — Dr. Joel Levine
 Thomas Ryan — Gary Klausner
 Alex Carter — Nantz

24: Live Another Day

Bauer and associates
 Kiefer Sutherland — Jack Bauer
 Branko Tomović — Belcheck

CIA London
 Yvonne Strahovski — Kate Morgan
 Gbenga Akinnagbe — Erik Ritter
 Giles Matthey — Jordan Reed
 Benjamin Bratt — Steve Navarro
 Adam Sinclair — Gavin Leonard
 Christina Chong — Mariana

Federal Government officials, employees and associates
 William Devane — President James Heller
 Tate Donovan — Chief of Staff Mark Boudreau
 Kim Raver — Audrey Boudreau
 Ross McCall — Ron Clark
 Colin Salmon — General Coburn
 John Boyega — First Lieutenant Chris Tanner
 Duncan Pow — Captain Greg Denovo

United Kingdom officials, employees and associates
 Stephen Fry — Prime Minister Alastair Davies
 Miranda Raison — Caroline Fowlds
 James Puddephatt — Ken

Open Cell
 Mary Lynn Rajskub — Chloe O'Brian
 Michael Wincott — Adrian Cross
 Joseph Millson — Derrick Yates
 Mandeep Dhillon — Chell
 Charles Furness — Pete

Drone terrorist plot
 Michelle Fairley — Margot Al-Harazi
 Emily Berrington — Simone Al-Harazi
 Liam Garrigan — Ian Al-Harazi
 Sacha Dhawan — Naveed Shabazz

Russian Federation
 Stanley Townsend — Anatol Stolnavich

Miscellaneous characters
 Tzi Ma — Cheng Zhi
 Alex Lanipekun — James Harman
 Tamer Hassan — Aron Bashir/Basher

List of U.S. presidents

References
 

 
Lists of action television characters
24
Lists of American crime television series characters
Lists of American drama television series characters